Subin Bhattarai (born 5 November 1982) is a Nepalese writer and columnist, best known for his romance novels such as Summer Love and Saaya. He published his first book Kathaki Paatra, a collection of short stories, in 2011. His works are mostly popular among the young readers. He is also a columnist for Kantipur Saptahik, a youth–oriented weekly newspaper.

Early life and education 
Bhattarai was born in Khotang district in the eastern region of Nepal. His father was a government official and mother, a housewife. A year after his birth, his parent moved to Kathmandu, where he grew up. He received  a master's degree in Environmental Science from Tribhuvan University in 2005. He names B.P Koirala, Parijat, Dhruba Chandra Gautam and Dha. Cha. Gotame as some of his favourite writers.

Writing career 
Bhattarai started writing in school at the age of 10. He wrote poems, and recited several on Radio Nepal. He acted in several dramas as child artist and co-hosted the popular children's program Hatemalo on Radio Nepal.

His first book, Kathaki Paatra, an anthology of short stories, was published in 2011. The stories revolve around urban youths and love. Though commercially an average, Bhattarai was critically acclaimed in his first book. He was then inspired to write a youth centered novel.

His second book a romance novel titled Summer Love, published at the end of 2012 became a commercial success. The book is about college students at the Central Department of Environmental Science at Tribhuwan University falling in love. It became a best selling book in Nepal with in excess of 40,000 copies sold. Its success made Bhattarai popular among youths. In 2019, the novel was adapted into a movie, of same name, by Muskan Dhakal. The English translation of the novel was published on 15 August 2015. The novel was translated by Pratima Sharma.

After a year and a half, in August 2014, Saaya, the sequel to Summer Love was published. The book was released by actresses Garima Panta and Keki Adhikari, with Bhattarai himself at the premises of Nepal Academy, in the premises of hundreds of readers. It too became a best selling book in Nepal, was reprinted in the same month it was released, and was one of the best-selling books in the country for the year.

Bhattarai's fourth book, Monsoon, a romance novel was published on 24 September 2016.

In 2018, he published his fourth book, a novel titled Priye Sufi. In Priye Sufi, the story is narrated from the perspective of an older sister and how she overcomes her depression and her rare medical condition with love and care from her sister and father, but most importantly self-love.

In 2022, he published his sixth book, a romance novel titled Ijoriya. The novel is set in the Maithili speaking region of southern Nepal. The book was published on the premises of Nepal Academy in the presence of Bhattarai's peers and readers.

Notable works

References

1982 births
Living people
Nepalese male novelists
21st-century novelists
People from Khotang District
Tribhuvan University alumni
Nepali-language writers from Nepal
21st-century Nepalese male writers